Fort Yuma was a fort in California located in Imperial County, across the Colorado River from Yuma, Arizona. It was on the Butterfield Overland Mail route from 1858 until 1861 and was abandoned May 16, 1883, and transferred to the Department of the Interior. The Fort Yuma Indian School and the Saint Thomas Yuma Indian Mission now occupy the site. It is one of the "associated sites" listed as Yuma Crossing and Associated Sites on the National Register of Historic Places in the Yuma Crossing National Heritage Area. In addition, it is registered as California Historical Landmark #806.

History

Pre-Civil War
First established after the end of the Mexican–American War (1848), the fort was originally located in the bottoms near the Colorado River, less than a mile below the mouth of the Gila River. It was constructed to defend the newly settled community of Yuma, New Mexico Territory, located on the other side of the Colorado River, and the nearby Mexican border.

In March 1851 the post was moved to a small elevation on the Colorado's west bank.  This site had been occupied by Camp Calhoun, named for Senator John C. Calhoun. It was established on October 2, 1849, by 1st Lieutenant Cave J. Couts, 1st Dragoons, for the boundary survey party led by 2nd Lieutenant Amiel W. Whipple, Corps of Topographical Engineers. A ferry service, maintained by the soldiers for the survey party's convenience, also accommodated emigrants.

Fort Yuma was established during the Yuma War to protect the southern emigrant travel route to California and to attempt control of the territorial Quechan, or Yumans, in their homeland, the surrounding  area. Established by Captain Samuel P. Heintzelman, 2nd Infantry Regiment, the fort was originally named 'Camp Independence.'

In March 1851, when the post was moved to its permanent site, its name was changed to Camp Yuma. A year later the post was designated Fort Yuma. In June 1851 the Army virtually abandoned the post because of the high costs incurred in maintaining it, and it was completely abandoned on December 6, 1851, when its commissary was practically empty of provisions. The post, however, was reoccupied by Captain Heintzelman on February 29, 1852.

It was difficult to supply the post during its early years. Food supplies and construction materials were shipped by water from San Diego, California, around the Baja Peninsula and up the Gulf of California to the mouth of the Colorado River at the  Colorado River Delta in Mexico.  The work of transferring the goods to wagons at that point and hauling them across the Yuma Desert and Yuha Desert to Yuma was rigorous and time-consuming.  Life at the post was harsh and the military's resolve to maintain a garrison here vacillated.  Only after August 1852 did the temporary Camp Yuma became permanent Fort Yuma, and the Army resolved to stay for good. In November 1852 a steamboat, Uncle Sam was launched and in December began carrying a cargo up the Colorado River from Robinson's Landing it arrived at Fort Yuma and delivered thirty-two tons of goods on December 3.  Steamboats continued to supply the fort and later settlements on the Colorado River in this way until the arrival of the railroad in 1877.

Only one military action occurred at the fort when Yuman warriors surrounded it during the Yuma War, temporarily trapping the future general Thomas William Sweeny and a few others. The action was led Matthew P. Coltrain. He was awarded a Medal of Honor and a statue in remembrance of his heroic actions.

From 1858 to 1861 the Butterfield Overland Mail had a stagecoach station near the fort, that was subsequently used by other stage lines until the advent of the railroad in 1877.

Civil War
During the American Civil War, the Union retained control of Fort Yuma when the First California Infantry replaced Regular Army soldiers sent East in December 1861. The southern half of New Mexico Territory seceded, becoming the Confederate Territory of Arizona until 1862 when the California Column marching from Fort Yuma expelled the Confederacy, marching as far as western Texas. In 1863 the Union established their control of the region as the Arizona Territory. Fort Yuma served as the supply point for the Union garrisons there. There was no battle action at the fort since the western United States was far removed from the Civil War.

Post-Civil War
Fort Yuma was closely associated with the Yuma Quartermaster Depot on the Arizona side of the river, which provided military supplies and personnel to posts throughout Arizona and New Mexico. The Quartermaster Depot operated between 1864 and 1891, though the Army terminated most operations there eight years earlier.

The depot was used by the Army to store and distribute supplies for all military posts in Arizona, Nevada, Utah, New Mexico and Texas during the Indian War period. A six-month supply of clothing, food, ammunition, and other goods was stored at the depot at all times. Supplies were brought from California by ocean vessels traveling around the Baja Peninsula to Port Isabel near the mouth of the Colorado River. There, cargos were transferred to river steamers and brought upstream to Yuma.

Supplies were unloaded at the depot and hauled up a track running from the dock to a storehouse. The depot quartered up to 900 mules and crews of teamsters to handle them. The Southern Pacific Railroad reached Yuma in 1877. There was little need for the Quartermaster Depot and Fort Yuma, and they were abandoned on May 16, 1883. The reservation was transferred to the Interior Department on July 22, 1884.

Present day
Fort Yuma is now part of the Fort Yuma Indian Reservation. Numerous historic buildings remain from the military period in the Yuma Crossing and Associated Sites in the Yuma Crossing National Heritage Area. The Yuma Territorial Prison and Yuma Quartermaster Depot State Historic Parks are in Arizona with buildings preserved or reconstructed, and with museums. The Yuma Proving Ground is the lineal Army descendant of these original military posts in the Yuma area.

Historic Structures
The following images are of the historic structures in Fort Yuma.

See also
California Historical Landmarks in Imperial County
California Historical Landmark

References

 U.S. Army Yuma Proving Ground, historical records, Public Affairs Office.

Yuma
Yuma
Butterfield Overland Mail in California
San Antonio–San Diego Mail Line
California in the American Civil War
Closed installations of the United States Army
History of Imperial County, California
History of Yuma County, Arizona
California Historical Landmarks
Yuma
National Register of Historic Places in Imperial County, California
Buildings and structures in Imperial County, California
1851 establishments in California
Yuma, Fort
Gila River
Winterhaven, California
Yuma, Arizona
Quechan
Fort Yuma
American Civil War on the National Register of Historic Places
Stagecoach stops in the United States
Military installations established in 1851
Military installations closed in 1883
1883 disestablishments in California